John Hock may refer to:
 John Hock (American football)
 John Hock (sculptor)